Humberto Medina (5 September 1942 – 24 November 2011) was a Mexican footballer. He was born in Guadalajara, Jalisco. He competed at the 1968 Summer Olympics in Mexico City, where the Mexico placed fourth.

References

External links

1942 births
2011 deaths
Footballers from Guadalajara, Jalisco
Olympic footballers of Mexico
Footballers at the 1968 Summer Olympics
Pan American Games gold medalists for Mexico
Pan American Games medalists in football
Mexican footballers
Association football defenders
Footballers at the 1967 Pan American Games
Medalists at the 1967 Pan American Games